Roy George Parsons (24 June 1909 – 25 October 1991) was a New Zealand bookseller. He was born in Gravesend, Kent, England in 1909.

In 1965, he unsuccessfully stood for the Wellington City Council on a Citizens' Association ticket.

References

1909 births
1991 deaths
People from Gravesend, Kent
New Zealand booksellers
English emigrants to New Zealand
People from Wellington City